is a passenger railway station located in the city of Hachiōji, Tokyo, Japan, operated by the private railway operator Keio Corporation.

Lines
The station is located 18.2 km from the starting point of the Sagamihara Line at Chōfu. All services stop at this station.

Station layout
The station consists of two side platforms serving two tracks. The station building and concourse is located above the tracks.

Platforms

History
Minami-ōsawa Station opened on 21 May 1988. It initially formed the western terminus of the Sagamihara Line, until the line was extended to Hashimoto in 1990.

Passenger statistics
In fiscal 2019, the station was used by an average of 63,422 passengers daily.

The passenger figures (boarding passengers only) for previous years are as shown below.

Surrounding area
 Tokyo Metropolitan University Minami-ōsawa campus
 Mitsui Outlet Park Tama Ōsawa 
 Minami-ōsawa Police Station

References

External links

 Keio station information 

Railway stations in Japan opened in 1988
Railway stations in Tokyo
Stations of Keio Corporation
Hachiōji, Tokyo